David Lloyd Evans Jr. (1848–1929) was a member of the Wisconsin State Assembly.

Biography
Evans was born on September 17, 1848, in Caernarvon, Wales. In 1853, he settled with his parents in what is now Berlin, Wisconsin. During the American Civil War, Evans served with the 41st Wisconsin Volunteer Infantry Regiment and the 49th Wisconsin Volunteer Infantry Regiment of the Union Army. Afterwards, he joined the Grand Army of the Republic and served in the United States Revenue Cutter Service. Eventually, Evans became a farmer of dairy and other goods. He married the Welsh-born Mary Jane Thomas (1844–1928).

Political career
Evans was elected to the Assembly in a special election in 1899 after the death of William Hughes. He would remain a member through the 1903 session. Previously, Evans was Treasurer of Aurora, Waushara County, Wisconsin from 1875 to 1876 and was elected Chairman (similar to Mayor) of the town board of supervisors (similar to city council) in 1898. He was a Republican. 
Evans died on January 10, 1929, and is buried in Berlin, Wisconsin.

References

External links
The Political Graveyard

1848 births
1929 deaths
People from Caernarfon
Welsh emigrants to the United States
People from Berlin, Wisconsin
Mayors of places in Wisconsin
Wisconsin city council members
City and town treasurers in the United States
People of Wisconsin in the American Civil War
United States Revenue Cutter Service officers
Farmers from Wisconsin
Dairy farmers
People from Waushara County, Wisconsin
Republican Party members of the Wisconsin State Assembly